State Road 44 (NM 44) was a state highway in the US state of New Mexico. NM 44's southern terminus was in Cedar Crest from 1940-1988 and in Bernalillo from 1988–2000, and the northern terminus was in Aztec from 1940-1988 and in Bloomfield from 1988–2000. The route became an extension of U.S. Route 550 (US 550) in 2000 after the road was changed from a 2-lane to 4-lane-divided highway from Bloomfield to Bernalillo.

History

In the 1930s, the section between Cuba and Farmington was known as NM 55. By 1940 NM 44 was moved to the road NM 55 followed, and the NM 55 designation was removed. The section east of Interstate 25 (US 85) was renumbered in 1988 as NM 165 and as an extension of NM 536, and the segment between Bloomfield and Aztec became NM 544 because NM 44 had a short concurrency with US 64. In the late 80s and early 90s the accident rates began to increase which prompted New Mexico Department of Transportation to upgrade the entire road from Aztec to Bernalillo from 2-lane to a 4-lane-divided over a several-year period at a cost of $312 million, and once construction was complete NM 44 and NM 544 became an extension of US 550 in 2000.

Major intersections
Based on 1988-2000 routing.

See also

References

Former state highways in New Mexico